Stadionul Comunal is a multi-purpose stadium in Sânmartin, Romania. It is currently used mostly for football matches, is the home ground of Lotus Băile Felix and has a capacity of 1,000 people (500 on seats).

References

External links
Stadionul Comunal (Sânmartin) at soccerway.com

Football venues in Romania
Sport in Bihor County
Buildings and structures in Bihor County